USCGC Seneca may refer to one of the following United States Coast Guard cutters:

 , launched 1908; decommissioned 1936; scrapped 1950
 , launched 1984, commissioned 1987; in active service as of 2008

United States Coast Guard ship names